Klieman is a surname. Notable people with the surname include:
Aaron Klieman (1939–2021), American-born Israeli historian
Chris Klieman (born 1967), American football player and coach
Ed Klieman (1918–1979), American baseball player
Rikki Klieman (born 1948), American criminal defense lawyer

See also
Kleiman